Paul Clayton is the name of:

Paul Clayton (actor) (born 1957), English actor who starred in Peep Show and Him and Her
Paul Clayton (singer) (1931–1967), American folksinger and folksong collector
Paul Clayton (footballer) (born 1965), former professional footballer
Paul Clayton (Coronation Street), character from the British TV soap Coronation Street